Pignolo (plural pignoli;  also pinolo and pinoli) may refer to:

Pine nut, seed from trees of the genus Pinus
Any cookie with pine nuts:
Biscotto, twice baked cookie (biscuit), when made with pine nuts
Pignolo (macaroon), typical of Sicily
Pignolo (grape), a wine grape typical of Friuli
Ribolla Gialla, another Italian/Slovenian wine grape that is also known as Pignolo
Bianchetta Trevigiana, Italian wine grape known as Pignolo bianco
Pignolo, a heritage variety of maize; see Italian traditional maize varieties

See also
Pignola, a town in southern Italy and a variety of wine grape grown there
Pinole, maize that is dried, toasted, ground, and cooked in liquid